

Legislative Assembly elections
Elections to the State Legislative Assemblies were held in three Indian states during February 2005, Bihar, Haryana and Jharkhand. In Haryana the Indian National Congress won a landslide victory, dethroning the long-time Chief Minister Om Prakash Chautala. In Bihar and Jharkhand there was a fractured verdict. Since no government could be formed in Bihar, fresh elections were held in October–November the same year.

Bihar

February

October

Haryana

Jharkhand

Rajya Sabha

References

External links

 Election Commission of India

2005 elections in India
India
2005 in India
Elections in India by year